Altered Carbon is an American cyberpunk television series created by Laeta Kalogridis and based on the 2002 novel of the same title by English author Richard K. Morgan. In a world where consciousness can be transferred to different bodies, Takeshi Kovacs, a former soldier turned investigator, is released from prison in order to solve a murder. The first season consists of ten episodes and premiered on Netflix on February 2, 2018. On July 27, 2018, the series was renewed for a second season of eight episodes, which was released on February 27, 2020, with an anime film set before the first season released on March 19, 2020.  Though the series received generally positive reviews, it was canceled after two seasons.

Synopsis 

The series starts over 360 years in the future, with most episodes of the first season set in the year 2384 in a futuristic metropolis known as Bay City. In the future, a person's memories and consciousness (termed digital human freight, or DHF) are recorded onto a disk-shaped device called a cortical stack, which is implanted in the vertebrae at the back of the neck. These storage devices are of alien design and have been reverse-engineered and mass-produced but can only be made from the material on Harlan's World. Physical human or synthetic bodies are called "sleeves" and stacks can be transferred to new bodies after death, but a person can still be killed if their stack is destroyed and there is no backup. Only the wealthiest, known as "Meths" in reference to Methuselah, have the means to change bodies through clones and remote storage of their consciousness in satellites, so they never have to die of old age before being resleeved.

Takeshi Kovacs, a political operative with mercenary skills, is the sole surviving soldier of the Envoys, a rebel group defeated in an uprising against the new world order. In the first season, set 250 years after the Envoys are destroyed, his stack is pulled out of prison by 300-year-old Meth Laurens Bancroft, one of the wealthiest men in the settled worlds. Bancroft offers him the chance to solve a murder—Bancroft's own—to get a new shot at life. The second season takes place in the early 2410s, set 30 years after the first season: Kovacs, now in a new sleeve, continues to search for his lost love and Envoy leader Quellcrist Falconer.

Cast

Main 
 Joel Kinnaman (season 1; flashbacks season 2), Anthony Mackie (season 2) and Ray Chase (Resleeved) as Takeshi "Tak" Kovacs, the last Envoy, of an elite rebel group defeated 250 years prior to the start of the series. Kinnaman also portrays Elias Ryker, a police officer and Ortega's former lover, whose "sleeve" or body Kovacs inhabits during season 1. Mackie serves as a new host body for Kovacs in season 2.
 James Purefoy as Laurens Bancroft (season 1), one of the wealthiest men alive, who lives in a skyscraper above the clouds and out of the reach of everyday people, ruthlessly powerful and wanting to exert control on those around him 
 Martha Higareda as Kristin Ortega (season 1; guest season 2), a smart and tough lieutenant in the Bay City Police Department who comes from a religious Mexican American family of cops 
 Chris Conner as Edgar Poe (seasons 1–2), an artificial intelligence (AI) that takes the likeness of Edgar Allan Poe and runs the hotel that serves as Kovacs' base of operations in Bay City
 Dichen Lachman (season 1; guest season 2) and Elizabeth Maxwell (Resleeved) as Reileen Kawahara / Gina, Kovacs' sister, who shared his violent childhood, who joined the Envoys at the same time as he did, and apparently perished when the uprising was put down 
 Ato Essandoh as Vernon Elliot (season 1; guest season 2), a former Protectorate marine whose wife was imprisoned and daughter murdered 
 Kristin Lehman as Miriam Bancroft and Naomi Bancroft (season 1), Laurens' wife who has her own motivations, and their daughter who steals her mother's sleeve. Lehman said she was "really intrigued and challenged" to play the character of Miriam, considering it different from her other work. Her background as a dancer helped her prepare for the role. Of the character's sexuality, "She has commodified her sexuality and I was interested in exploring that side of the character." 
 Trieu Tran as Mister Leung / Ghostwalker (season 1), a killer and "fixer" who kills and solves problems for a mysterious employer
 Renée Elise Goldsberry as Quellcrist "Quell" Falconer (née Nadia Makita) (seasons 1–2), a master strategist and scientist, the creator of Stacks and leader of the Envoys. She was seemingly killed when the rebellion was put down, additionally appearing in Kovacs' flashbacks and hallucinations.
 Lela Loren as Danica Harlan (season 2), the governor of Harlan's World and the daughter of its founder, Konrad Harlan
 Simone Missick as Trepp, a bounty hunter (season 2)
 Dina Shihabi as Dig 301 (season 2), an AI archaeologue who befriends Poe
 Torben Liebrecht as Jaeger / Ivan Carrera (season 2), Kovacs' commanding officer in the CTAC Praetorian and surrogate father, later the leader of an elite fighting force called The Wedge operating on Harlan's World. Daniel Bernhardt portrays the character's previous sleeve in a recurring capacity in seasons 1–2.

Recurring

 Byron Mann as Mercenary Kovacs (season 1; flashbacks season 2) and Dimitri Kadmin (season 1)
 Tamara Taylor as Oumou Prescott (season 1)
 Marlene Forte as Alazne Ortega (season 1)
 Tahmoh Penikett as Dimitri (season 1)
 Matt Frewer as Carnage (season 1)
 Hiro Kanagawa as Captain Tanaka (season 1)
 Hayley Law as Lizzie Elliot (seasons 1–2)
 Will Yun Lee as Original Takeshi Kovacs / "Kovacs Prime" (seasons 1–2)
 Adam Busch as Mickey (season 1)
 Michael Shanks as Horace Axley (season 2)
 Sen Mitsuji as Tanaseda Yukito (season 2)
 Waleed Zuaiter as Samir Abboud (season 1)
 James Saito (season 2) and Doug Stone (Resleeved) as Tanaseda Hideki
 Neal McDonough as Konrad Harlan (season 2)

Development

Production 
Netflix ordered the series in January 2016, fifteen years after Laeta Kalogridis optioned the novel with the intent of making a feature film. According to Kalogridis, the complex nature of the novel and its R-rated material meant that it was a tough sell for studios before Netflix ordered the series. The show was one of a number of dramas commissioned in short order by Netflix, which had committed to spending $5 billion on original content.

Kalogridis wrote the script and served as executive producer and showrunner. Steve Blackman served as co-showrunner. David Ellison, Dana Goldberg and Marcy Ross of Skydance Television also served as producers, as well as Brad Fischer and James Vanderbilt of Kalogridis' Mythology Entertainment. Miguel Sapochnik directed the pilot episode. Morgan served as a consultant during the show's production.

The series was reportedly the most expensive Netflix production to date. The production costs were not disclosed but Kinnaman said it had "bigger budget than the first three seasons of Game of Thrones".

Ann Foley served as costume designer. The production crew fitted about 2,000 costumers and custom made at least 500 pieces for the show, and emphasized "grounded" looks for future fashion but figured in specific details, such as a unique palette for Meth characters and subtle costume changes when different people are inhabiting the same sleeve.

The series is produced in Vancouver, British Columbia, Canada.
Laurens Bancroft's gardens was filmed in University of British Columbia Rose Garden and the lobby of the Marine Building served as Bancroft's home. The old Canada Post building was used as the location of The Wei Clinic, where Kovacs was tortured. Scenes with the Envoys were filmed on the Sea to Sky Gondola suspension bridge, in Squamish. Other Vancouver locations include the Convention Centre's West Building, the visitor centre at VanDusen Botanical Garden, the UBC Museum of Anthropology and The Qube.

The series contains references to several earlier cyberpunk classics, such as Blade Runner and Ghost in the Shell, as well as several literary works, such as the stories of Edgar Allan Poe.

Altered Carbon was renewed for a second season in July 2018. Anthony Mackie took over the lead role of Takeshi Kovacs, replacing the first season lead star Joel Kinnaman. Additionally, Alison Schapker joined the series as co-showrunner alongside Laeta Kalogridis. On May 23, 2019, it was announced that Schapker would be the primary showrunner for the series, replacing Laeta Kalogridis who is still credited as an executive producer.

On August 26, 2020, Netflix canceled the series after two seasons. The decision had been made in April and was not related to COVID-19, but a result of the standard process used by Netflix to calculate the viewership versus the renewal costs.

Adaptation of the novels

First season 
The first season is based on Richard Morgan's 2002 novel Altered Carbon. While most of the major plot points in the book are retained, the adaptation featured several major changes for characters and organizations. In the novel, the Envoys are elite soldiers of the United Nations Protectorate based on Earth, quite the opposite of the freedom-fighting rebels of the show, originating from Harlan's World, where Kovacs was born.

In the book, Kovacs was imprisoned for his freelance work after leaving the Envoys, while in the show, Kovacs is a captured rebel. The character of Reileen Kawahara in the novel was merely Kovacs' ruthless underworld boss and had no blood relation with him, in contrast to their sibling relationship in the show. The Envoy who trained Kovacs in the book was Virginia Vidaura. The show's Vidaura is only a minor character. Instead, his trainer is given the name and backstory of Quellcrist Falconer, who in book three is the historical messiah-like figure. Falconer's rebellion occurred not during Kovacs' training, as in the show, but long before Kovacs was born in the books.

The Hendrix is an AI character in the novel; it runs the hotel and takes the form of Jimi Hendrix. Hendrix's estate declined to license his image for the television series because of its violence. Instead, showrunner Kalogridis chose the likeness of Edgar Allan Poe and a Victorian era hotel for the replacement Poe character and said it would juxtapose well with the futuristic Bay City.

Anime film 

On November 7, 2018, Netflix announced a spin-off anime film serving to "expand the universe" of the series and new elements of the story mythology was in active development. Titled Altered Carbon: Resleeved, the feature uses character designs by manga artist Yasuo Ōtagaki, is written by Dai Satō and Tsukasa Kondo, directed by Takeru Nakajima and Yoshiyuki Okada, produced by Anima, and features an original music score by Keigo Hoashi Kinuyiki Takahashi from Monaca. The film was released on March 19, 2020.

On Rotten Tomatoes, Altered Carbon: Resleeved has an approval rating of 60% based on reviews from 5 critics. David Griffin of IGN gave it 6 out of 10, called it "a diverting entry in the Takeshi Kovacs saga that excels in the action department while neglecting to fully develop its main characters in a way that makes a lasting impact." John Serba of Decider.com wrote: "Resleeved won’t knock anyone’s socks off, but it effectively pleases newcomers and hardcores alike." Paul Tassi of Forbes said Altered Carbon: Resleeved was "not worth watching, even for fans" comparing it to a video game but without the interactivity.

Episodes

Season 1 (2018)

Season 2 (2020)

Specials

Anime film (2020)

Themes 
Human-machine interface, gender identity, technology and society, cyberspace and objective reality, hyper-urbanization that passes up urban planning, artificial intelligence, paranoia.

Reception

Critical response

Season 1 
On review aggregation website Rotten Tomatoes, the first season holds an approval rating of 68% based on 95 reviews, and an average rating of 6.59/10. The website's critical consensus reads, "Altered Carbon leans hard into its cyberpunk roots, serving up an ambitiously pulpy viewing experience that often overwhelms, but never bores." On Metacritic, the season has a weighted average score of 64 out of 100, based on 25 critics, indicating "generally favorable reviews."

David Griffin of IGN said the show "gets almost everything right" as a "cyberpunk fantasyland." Griffin praised the visuals and the complexity of the plot, as well as the acting, such as Chris Conner's performance as the AI hotel manager Poe. He also wrote of the show's problems, such as the intricacies of the murder often got "in the way of the show's momentum" and the murder plot "loses steam" early on. He ultimately gave it a score of 8.8 out of 10, summarizing it as "A visual titan with a less than stellar story." Michael Rougeau of GameSpot made a point of calling it "hardcore" science fiction, as a "noir sci-fi/gumshoe thriller bursting with the trappings of both genres, from murdered prostitutes and holographic billboard ads to AIs who flit between the real world and some convoluted cyberspace." The review praised how deeply the show examined and explored the cortical stack, the central concept. Catherine Pearson of Digital Spy said the visuals were magnificent and the themes fascinating, but that it had flaws; for example, the characters "mumbling their way through long expository dialogue."

The Vancouver Sun summarized that the reaction of professional critics was mixed, and that the critics' conclusion was that the "murder mystery takes a back seat to the show's futuristic visuals." Entertainment Weekly also summarized reviews, saying the consensus was that the visuals were spectacular, but the violence against women raised questions. Darren Franich of Entertainment Weekly gave it a "B−" grade and wrote that the "show tackles race, gender, and class with all the subtlety of a blowtorch." Forbes criticized other critics for speaking negatively of the show and called it "terrific" and one of the best science fiction shows on television. Andrew Liptak of The Verge called it engrossing, but criticized the lack of focus on the relationships between the characters.

Robert Lloyd of the Los Angeles Times gave it a mixed review, but particularly praised Kinnaman, even if the fight scenes were described as tedious in a way. Jen Chaney of Vulture said the show was "ambitious, convoluted, violent, derivative, and somehow simultaneously grimy and glossy," but ultimately gave it a negative review, saying "the visual candy and philosophical subtext of Altered Carbon may wash over me, but none of it gets absorbed in any lasting way." Radio Times wrote that the "drama tries to find its groove by shifting erratically from noir detective drama to war epic to soap opera, ultimately failing to meet its own lofty ambitions: it's a thunderous haymaker that only manages to graze its target." The review noted that the show takes on too much, and that much of the story could have been left for a second season. Benjamin Lee at The Guardian gave the series 3/5, praising the "sheer ambitious scale of it all" and "it's an impressive step up from what we're usually offered." Lee compared it to the work of Paul Verhoeven only lacking the social commentary. He concludes "it's refreshing to see a show so unashamed about its pulpiness. The spectacle might grow stale but for now, the flash is blinding."

Many critics focused on the show's violence. Gavia Baker-Whitelaw of The Daily Dot wrote that the show seemed to use "the dystopian setting as an excuse for sexualized violence," and that the focus on dead, naked women's bodies "was a massive distraction from the show's stronger points, like the well-choreographed fight scenes and Takeshi Kovacs' backstory." Digital Spy defended the level of violence, arguing it accurately reflected the books, and was "the point" of the franchise, as "without showing brutal, unremitting violence, Altered Carbon would fail to fully explore the dystopian reality it aims to present." Kimberly Roots of TVLine also criticized the scenes of violence and nudity, and also said the story suffered from uneven pacing. However, she noted that the investigation part "clicks along smartly," and that the fight sequences were "sophisticated". She gave it a "B−" grade.

Season 2 
On Rotten Tomatoes, the second season holds an approval rating of 83% based on 35 reviews, and an average rating of 7.16/10. The website's critical consensus reads, "While not quite there yet, a clearer sense of purpose and more defined characters help Altered Carbon sophomore season step closer to the brilliance of its source material." On Metacritic, the season has a weighted average score of 65 out of 100, based on 8 critics, indicating "generally favorable reviews".

Accolades

References

External links 

  on Netflix
 
 Altered Carbon glossary at ScreenRant

2010s American drama television series
2010s American science fiction television series
2020s American drama television series
2020s American science fiction television series
2018 American television series debuts
2020 American television series endings
Cyberpunk television series
Dystopian television series
Neo-noir television series
English-language Netflix original programming
Television shows based on British novels
Television shows filmed in Vancouver
Television shows set in San Francisco
Television series by Skydance Television
Television series set in the 24th century
Works about the Yakuza
Artificial intelligence in fiction
Fiction about consciousness transfer